Strawberry latent C virus is a plant pathogenic virus of the family Rhabdoviridae.

References

External links 
 ICTVdB - The Universal Virus Database: Strawberry latent C virus
 Family Groups - The Baltimore Method

Rhabdoviridae
Viral strawberry diseases